Euphorbia ampliphylla (also called Euphorbia winklerii and Euphorbia obovalifolia) is a succulent rainforest tree of the montane rainforests throughout East Africa and belonging to the Spurge Family (Euphorbiaceae). The branches are succulent and three-winged and pachycaulous. Like most euphorbs, it has milky white sap. The toxicity of many euphorbs is well known, but no specific information is available concerning E. ampliphylla. It is used locally for medical purposes. It is also the world's only known succulent rainforest tree.

As most other succulent members of the genus Euphorbia, its trade is regulated under Appendix II of CITES.

References

ampliphylla
ampliphylla
Flora of East Tropical Africa